Noen Maprang District
 Noen Maprang Subdistrict Municipality
 Noen Maprang Subdistrict